Bombycodes is a genus of moths in the family Geometridae.

Species
 Bombycodes aspilaria Guenée, 1857
 Bombycodes fumosa (Warren, 1894)

References
 Bombycodes at Markku Savela's Lepidoptera and Some Other Life Forms
Natural History Museum Lepidoptera genus database

Ennominae